Fabio Conti (born 22 March 1972) is an Italian water polo coach. He was the head coach of the Italy women's national water polo team at the 2012 and 2016 Summer Olympics, where the team won the silver medal in 2016.

References

External links
 

1972 births
Living people
Italian male water polo players
Italian water polo coaches
Italy women's national water polo team coaches
Water polo coaches at the 2012 Summer Olympics
Water polo coaches at the 2016 Summer Olympics